Death of a Cyclist is a 1955 social realist Spanish drama film directed by Juan Antonio Bardem and starring Italian actress Lucia Bosè, who was dubbed into Spanish by Elsa Fábregas. It won the FIPRESCI Award at the 1955 Cannes Film Festival.

Plot
The Death of a Cyclist begins with the return of Juan Fernandez Soler (Alberto Closas), a university professor, and María Jose (Lucia Bosè), a wealthy married woman, from an adulterous endeavor. While speeding down the road, María Jose and Juan hit a cyclist with their car. Although the cyclist was alive when they left him, his reported death causes both María Jose and Juan great anxiety in their personal lives.

For María Jose, the exposure of this crime (and thus the affair) would mean the potential loss of her world as a wealthy socialite. However, the cyclist's death causes Juan to instead reflect on his own life choices, including his life as a former falange soldier, and the hypocrisy of his world as a member of the upper class. The suspense of these anxieties is exacerbated by the meddling Rafa (Carlos Casaravilla), who is a lowly art critic that has spent the past few months observing the socialites that he has been surrounding himself with. His intentions to "purify" the upper class are revealed through his plan to expose María Jose and Juan. Juan and María Jose's differing responses to the cyclist's death are significant in the film's commentary surrounding the upper class.

By the end of the film, Juan is ready to turn himself and María Jose into the police. However, María Jose would do anything to protect the world she is comfortable in. Thus, María Jose runs Juan over in an attempt to return to her life as it was before, presumably murdering him. The action of running over Juan represents the upper class's obsession with staying in power.  Yet, while returning to her husband after committing this crime, she is run off of a bridge by a cyclist and falls to her death. The last shot of the film sees the cyclist riding away, intentions unknown.

Cast
 Lucia Bosè as María José de Castro
 Alberto Closas as Juan Fernandez Soler
 Otello Toso as Miguel Castro
 Bruna Corra as Matilde Luque
 Carlos Casaravilla as Rafael "Rafa" Sandoval
 Manuel Alexandre as cyclist

Reception

Critical analysis
Film critic Robert Koehler wrote of the director's goals when shooting the film, "With the economy of Tourneur and Walsh, Bardem immediately establishes in the opening frames of Death of a Cyclist not only the incident to which the title refers, but also, more crucially, that lovers Juan (Alberto Closas) and María José (Lucia Bosé) are doomed... The Rafa-María José-Miguel interplay is sprinkled with irony, sarcasm, and suggestion, and comes to a boil with the help of social satire, revenge, paranoia, and suspicion. It's quite a soup, and Bardem has fun dipping into it. Contrary to the film's reputation as a stark rebuke of Franco-era hypocrisy and corruption, Death of a Cyclist is perhaps most surprising and memorable for this half-terrifying, half-comical roundelay of three people caught in a web of misunderstanding (María José mistakenly convinced that Rafa witnessed something of the bicycle accident) and distrust (each of them for the other).

Film critic Mark Mesaros discussed the stylistic aspects of the film, writing, "Death of a Cyclist is a polemical tale that borrows the grammar of the Hitchcockian murder mystery as well as the forbidden romance of film noir to achieve its ideologic ends... Beginning with the techniques that are most efficacious, it's necessary to emphasize Bardem's brilliant use of cuts and dissolves throughout. What will be remembered most by viewers is the way the film jump cuts effortlessly between the seemingly primary melodrama and scenes of so-called 'social realism'. At first the cuts are employed between bourgeois and working class milieus, but later more abstract associations will be made. It's apparent that our pair of privileged sinners lie totally outside of 'social reality': when their sports-car hits the cyclist we do not see his twisted frame, only the twisted frame of the bicycle, and the reactions of Juan and María José. Through the course of events Juan will be forced to interlope within the reality of the cyclist and his family, while María José will be further ensconced in the delicate net of her delusion."

American reviews
When first released in the United States in the 1950s, even though the film was hailed in Europe, The New York Times film critic Bosley Crowther panned the film and its style, writing "Aside from the fact that Señor Bardem has not chosen an especially novel theme or given his treatment of it any new or surprising twist, he has actually confused it with weird plotting and a wild, choppy cinematic style. Señor Bardem's cinematic syntax has no capitals or punctuation marks. He jumps from one scene to another without terminal notifications or dissolves. You have to be awfully attentive to figure out where you are...Maybe they have cut this Pathé picture, and the English subtitles are poor. But Señor Bardem will have to do better to make his laurels look deserved."  NOTE: The reason no one is citing other American reviews, which were good, is because the film was retitled after NY in 1957 - the retitle was Age of Infidelity. It opened on October 31, 1958 in Los Angeles and played through the end of the year.

Awards
 Winner, Cannes Film Festival: International Federation of Film Critics (FIPRESCI Prize), Juan Antonio Bardem, 1955
 Winner, Circulo de Escritores Cinematográficos, Photography, Alfredo Fraile, 1955

DVD
The film was released in the United States by The Criterion Collection.

Shown on the Turner Classic Movies show 'Noir Alley' with Eddie Muller on November 26, 2022.

References

External links
 
 
 
 Death of a Cyclist: Creating a Modern Spanish Cinema an essay by Marsha Kinder at the Criterion Collection
  by Film-O-Tech (Spain)
 Death of a Cyclist film review by Felicia Feaster at Turner Classic Movies
 

1955 films
1955 crime drama films
Spanish black-and-white films
Films directed by Juan Antonio Bardem
Films set in Madrid
1950s Spanish-language films
Social realism in film
Spanish crime drama films